Lucillianus ( 350–363 AD) was a high-ranking Roman army officer and father-in-law of the emperor Jovian. He fought with success in the war against Persia, and played a part in the execution of the emperor Constantius II's cousin, Gallus. In 361, Lucillianus was kidnapped by the emperor Julian and forced into retirement. He was recalled to service after the accession of his son-in-law Jovian in 363, and given a senior military command, only to be murdered that same year by mutinous troops in Gaul.

Biography

Career under Constantius II
Lucillianus was the father of Charito, wife of the Roman emperor Jovian. He probably, like Jovian, came from the province of Pannonia. His hometown may have been Sirmium, Moesia Superior, where he was once stationed and later resided during his retirement. In 350, the emperor Constantius II gave Lucillianus command of the war against the Sasanian Empire, and, in this capacity, he successfully defended the fortress of Nisibis against Persian attacks. In 354, Lucillianus was appointed  (commander of the household troops) of Constantius's cousin, Gallus Caesar, with the secret purpose of keeping watch over Gallus as he was unknowingly escorted to his execution. In 358–359 he went alongside Procopius (the future imperial pretender) as an envoy to the Sasanian king Shapur II.

Lucillianus stood loyal to Constantius when the emperor's other cousin, Julian, rebelled and proclaimed himself emperor in Gaul, 360. By 361 he had been appointed commander of Constantius's armies in Illyricum, with his headquarters at Sirmium, and intended to oppose Julian as he marched east. However, while lodged at the town of Bononia (Banoštor, Serbia) north of Sirmium, Lucillianus was surprised and captured in a night-time raid by Julian's troops; he was seized apparently while still asleep, and brought in a state of shock before the pretender. It was said Julian offered Lucillianus the opportunity to perform an act of submission and "adoration", to which the latter boldly responded by instead questioning the wisdom of the rebellion. When Constantius died that same year and Julian became undisputed Roman emperor, Lucillianus was stripped of his command and went into retirement at Sirmium.

Recall by Jovian and assassination
After the death of Julian during his expedition against Persia in 363, Lucillianus's son-in-law, Jovian, a member of Julian's household guard, was acclaimed emperor by the army. Jovian also took care to relieve the incumbent commander of the armies in Gaul, Jovinus, because, as a close supporter the emperor Julian, his loyalty to the new regime was apparently viewed as suspect. His new nominee, Malarichus, refused the position however, and, upon hearing of it, Lucillianus (having by then arrived at Mediolanum) promptly hurried to Remi (modern Reims), capital of Gallia Belgica, to claim the military command for himself.

Following his arrival, Lucillianus began an audit of the local administration because he suspected some officials of corruption and embezzlement. It was said he conducted his investigation with great vigor but little tact, because the corrupt staffers had taken care to gain the favor and protection of the soldiers. One uncovered culprit fled to the barracks, where his popularity with the troops guaranteed his safety. This official then stirred up the soldiers (probably the Batavi) by falsely claiming that the emperor Julian was still alive and Jovian was just a rebel. A mutiny ensued, at which Lucillianus was killed; one of his retainers, Seniauchus, shared his fate, while the other, Valentinian (soon-to-be emperor), escaped with his life. The emperor did not long outlive his father-in-law, dying in February of the following year.

Notes

Citations

References
 
 
 
 
 

	

363 deaths
4th-century Romans
Comites domesticorum
Comites rei militaris
Generals of Constantius II
Magistri equitum (Roman Empire)
Magistri peditum
Pannonians
People of the Roman–Sasanian Wars
Romans from unknown gentes
Year of birth unknown